The men's 5000 metres event at the 2013 Summer Universiade was held on 10–12 July.

Medalists

Results

Heats
Qualification: First 5 in each heat (Q) and the next 5 fastest (q) qualified for the final.

Final

References

5000
2013